Thomas Schleicher (21 November 1972 – 2 November 2001) was an Austrian judoka. He competed in the men's lightweight event at the 1996 Summer Olympics. He was later sentenced to five years in prison for drug trafficking, where he committed suicide.

Achievements

References

External links
 
 trailer

1972 births
2001 suicides
Austrian male judoka
Goodwill Games medalists in judo
Olympic judoka of Austria
Judoka at the 1996 Summer Olympics
Competitors at the 1994 Goodwill Games
Suicides in Austria
People who committed suicide in prison custody
Austrian people who died in prison custody
Prisoners who died in Austrian detention
Drug traffickers
Sportspeople from Salzburg
Austrian criminals
20th-century Austrian people
21st-century Austrian people